The 2001 Buy.com Tour season ran from Mar 8 to October 28. The season consisted of 28 official money golf tournaments, and one canceled tournament. Two tournaments were played outside of the United States. The top 15 players on the year-end money list earned their PGA Tour card for 2002.

Schedule
The following table lists official events during the 2001 season.

Money leaders
For full rankings, see 2001 Buy.com Tour graduates.

The money list was based on prize money won during the season, calculated in U.S. dollars. The top 15 players on the tour earned status to play on the 2002 PGA Tour.

Awards

See also
2001 Buy.com Tour graduates

Notes

References

External links
Full Schedule
Rankings and player profiles

Korn Ferry Tour seasons
Buy.com Tour